The Kokopera, also written Koko Bera, are an indigenous Australian people of the Cape York Peninsula of Northern Queensland.

Country
The Kokopera were a coastal people, ranging about the mouth of the Nassau River with an inland reach of some thirty miles, extending north as far as the Mitchell River, and south traditionally to Inkerman,
north of the Staaten River.

Alternative names
 Koko-bera
 Kukaberra
 Kungkara
 Konanin. (exonym used by neighbouring tribes)
 Goonanin
 Gunani, Gunanni, Goonamin, Goonamon
 Koko papung, Kokopapun
 Ba:bung

Notes

Citations

Sources

Aboriginal peoples of Queensland